Johann Truchet (born 16 August 1983) is a football defender who plays for the French Championnat National 2 club AS Furiani-Agliani.

Truchet signed for then Ligue 2 side Stade de Reims in the summer of 2007 from En Avant de Guingamp.

Honours
 Trophée des Champions: 2004

External links
 

1983 births
Living people
Sportspeople from Villefranche-sur-Saône
Association football defenders
French footballers
Olympique Lyonnais players
Stade de Reims players
En Avant Guingamp players
CA Bastia players
Borgo FC players
FC Bastia-Borgo players
Footballers from Auvergne-Rhône-Alpes